In 1966, the United States FBI, under Director J. Edgar Hoover, continued for a seventeenth year to maintain a public list of the people it regarded as the Ten Most Wanted Fugitives.

Throughout the year 1966, six of the ten places on the list remained filled by these elusive long-time fugitives from prior years, then still at large:

 1962 #170 (four years), Edward Howard Maps remained still at large
 1964 #193 (two years), Chester Collins remained still at large
 1964 #197 (two years), Alson Thomas Wahrlich remained still at large
 1965 #203 (one year), John William Clouser remained still at large
 1965 #208 (one year), Donald Stewart Heien arrested February 3, 1966
 1965 #220 (one year), Edward Owens Watkins arrested December 2, 1966

By year end, a clear trend had emerged in the years of the mid-1960s, during which the FBI consistently was able to list and then capture the largest number of fugitives in multiple back to back years than in any other period in history for the top ten list.  Keeping pace with this trend, the FBI added a total of an additional nineteen new Fugitives in 1966.

1966 also brought the first ever dual listing of two Fugitives at the same time, on February 16, Charles Lorin Gove at #229 and Ralph Dwayne Owen at #230.

1966 fugitives
The "Ten Most Wanted Fugitives" listed by the FBI in 1966 include (in FBI list appearance sequence order):

Hoyt Bud Cobb
January 6, 1966 #224
Five months on the list
Hoyt Bud Cobb - U.S. prisoner arrested June 6, 1966 in Hialeah, Florida by the FBI after a citizen recognized him
from a Front Page Detective magazine article

James Robert Bishop
January 10, 1966 #225
Two weeks on the list
James Robert Bishop - U.S. prisoner arrested January 21, 1966 in Aspen, Colorado by the FBI after a citizen recognized him from an Identification Order. He had been working as a kitchen helper.

Robert Van Lewing
January 12, 1966 #226
Three weeks on the list
Robert Van Lewing - U.S. prisoner arrested February 6, 1967 in Kansas City, Missouri by the FBI after a citizen recognized him in a feature story in This Week magazine. In March 1966, he had entered a St. Louis, Missouri bank and, threatening the bank teller with a pistol, escaped with $2,456.

Earl Ellery Wright
January 14, 1966 #227
Five months on the list
Earl Ellery Wright - U.S. prisoner arrested June 20, 1966 in Cleveland, Ohio.

Jessie James Roberts
February 3, 1966 #228
Five days on the list
Jessie James Roberts - U.S. prisoner arrested February 8, 1966 in Laredo, Texas.

Charles Lorin Gove
February 16, 1966 #229
One day on the list, first dual listing, with Fugitive #230
Charles Lorin Gove - U.S. prisoner arrested February 16, 1966 on Bourbon Street in the French Quarter of New Orleans, Louisiana.

Ralph Dwayne Owen
February 16, 1966 #230
One month on the list, first dual listing, with Fugitive #229
Ralph Dwayne Owen - U.S. prisoner arrested March 11, 1966 in Kansas City, Missouri.

Jimmy Lewis Parker
February 25, 1966 #231
Two weeks on the list
Jimmy Lewis Parker - U.S. prisoner arrested March 4, 1966 in Detroit, Michigan.

Jack Daniel Sayadoff
March 17, 1966 #232
One week on the list
Jack Daniel Sayadoff - U.S. prisoner arrested March 24, 1966 in Indianapolis, Indiana.

Robert Clayton Buick
March 24, 1966 #233
Five days on the list
Robert Clayton Buick - U.S. prisoner arrested March 29, 1966 in Pecos, Texas by a police officer who recognized him from
a wanted poster.

James Vernon Taylor
April 4, 1966 #234
One day on the list
James Vernon Taylor - FOUND DEAD April 4, 1966 in Baltimore, Maryland by Baltimore Harbor Police.

Lynwood Irwin Mears
April 11, 1966 #235
One year on the list
Lynwood Irwin Mears - U.S. prisoner arrested May 2, 1967 in Winston-Salem, North Carolina by the FBI after a citizen
recognized him from an article in Twin City Sentinel newspaper.

James Robert Ringrose
April 15, 1966 #236
One year on the list
James Robert Ringrose - U.S. prisoner arrested in Hawaii after his return to the United States from Japan; was a Japanese prisoner apprehended March 29, 1967 in Osaka, Japan by Japanese Police while attempting to pass bad checks. He told the FBI Agents he had been saving an item for several years and now he needed it. He then presented them with the Monopoly game card, "Get Out of Jail Free."

Walter Leonard Lesczynski
June 16, 1966 #237
Three months on the list
Walter Leonard Lesczynski - U.S. prisoner arrested September 9, 1966 in Chicago, Illinois.

Donald Rogers Smelley
June 30, 1966 #238
Five months on the list
Donald Rogers Smelley - U.S. prisoner arrested November 8, 1966 in Hollywood, California.

George Ben Edmonson
September 21, 1966 #239
Nine months on the list
George Ben Edmonson - Canada prisoner arrested June 28, 1967 in Campbell's Bay, Quebec, Canada by the Royal Canadian Mounted Police after a Canadian citizen recognized him from an American magazine article.

Everett Leroy Biggs
November 21, 1966 #240
Two weeks on the list
Everett Leroy Biggs - U.S. prisoner arrested December 1, 1966 in Broomfield, Colorado.

Gene Robert Jennings
December 15, 1966 #241
Two months on the list
Gene Robert Jennings - U.S. prisoner arrested February 14, 1967 in Atlantic City, New Jersey by the FBI after a citizen
recognized him from an article in This Week magazine.

Clarence Wilbert McFarland
December 22, 1966 #242
Four months on the list
Clarence Wilbert McFarland - U.S. prisoner arrested April 4, 1967 in Baltimore, Maryland by Baltimore Police as a burglary suspect, and was identified from his fingerprints.

See also

Later entries
FBI Ten Most Wanted Fugitives, 2020s
FBI Ten Most Wanted Fugitives, 2010s
FBI Ten Most Wanted Fugitives, 2000s
FBI Ten Most Wanted Fugitives, 1990s
FBI Ten Most Wanted Fugitives, 1980s
FBI Ten Most Wanted Fugitives, 1970s
FBI Ten Most Wanted Fugitives, 1960s

Prior entries
FBI Ten Most Wanted Fugitives, 1950s

References

External links
Current FBI top ten most wanted fugitives at FBI site
FBI pdf source document listing all Ten Most Wanted year by year (removed by FBI)

 
1966 in the United States